Eritrean nationalism is centered on the fact that the Eritreans share a common history, and as such constitute a nation unto themselves. Even though there is a natural basis for Eritrean nationalism, there is still diversity within Eritrean demographics. Eritrea has nine major ethnic groups, each with their own language and culture and is split between two major religions, Christianity and Islam. However, the Eritrean government seeks to foster Eritrean nationalism through programs such as national service, the promotion of civic nationalism and the formation of the youth organization YPFDJ, as well as curbing foreign influences.

Symbols
Symbols that have been associated with Eritrean nationalism include the emblem of Eritrea, the anthem Ertra, Ertra, Ertra, and the Flag of Eritrea as well as the Flag of the EPLF. Movements that have been associated with Eritrean nationalism include the Eritrean Liberation Front, Eritrean People's Liberation Front and People's Front for Democracy and Justice. People that are often associated with Eritrean nationalism include Isaias Afwerki, Sebhat Efrem and Ramadan Mohammed Nur.

See also
Pan-nationalism
Ethnic nationalism

References

 
Ethnic conflict
Ethnicity in politics
Ethnocentrism
Political theories
Politics and race